National Route 276 is a national highway of Japan connecting Esashi, Hokkaidō and Tomakomai, Hokkaidō in Japan, with a total length of 315.4 km (195.98 mi).

References

National highways in Japan
Roads in Hokkaido